Mathias Metternich (8 May 1747 – 13 September 1825) was a German mathematician and professor at the University of Mainz. As a revolutionary, he was active in the Republic of Mainz.

Early life and education
Metternich was born on 8 May 1747 in Steinefrenz, a village in the Electorate of Trier close to Montabaur. He was born into a family of farmers who had lived in the area since the 17th century. Supported by a nobleman, the count of Waldersdorff, Metternich was able to study at the Jesuit gymnasium in Hadamar. In 1770, he went to Mainz, where he was educated as an elementary school teacher at the normal school. 
He also studied mathematics at the University of Mainz from 1780 and at the University of Göttingen from 1784, where he studied with Abraham Gotthelf Kästner. In 1786, he obtained a doctorate in philosophy from the University of Erfurt, with a thesis about friction.

Professor and revolutionary
Metternich became professor of mathematics and experimental physics in Mainz in 1786. In 1791, Metternich and his colleague Andreas Joseph Hofmann initiated a split in the reading society, which separated into a democratic and an aristocratic part.

In the Republic of Mainz that supported revolutionary France, he was one of the founding members of the Jacobin Club and at times its president. After Mainz was taken by Prussian and other troops after the 1793 Siege of Mainz, Metternich was captured and mistreated, then imprisoned at Ehrenbreitstein Fortress and exiled to France in 1795. He worked as an administrator and journalist in French occupied territories, but was captured by imperial German troops again in October 1796, spending time in prison until he was released in April 1797 owing to the Treaty of Leoben.

Later life

Until 1800, he also worked in the administration of the  Mont-Tonnerre. He ceased his political activity in the Napoleonic era. In 1808, Metternich married Sophie Friederike Treffz. One of their children was Germain Metternich, who became a participant in the German revolutions of 1848–1849. 
Metternich died in Mainz on 13 September 1825.

References

Bibliography

1747 births
1825 deaths
Academic staff of Johannes Gutenberg University Mainz
18th-century German mathematicians
19th-century German mathematicians